The ball python (Python regius), also called the royal python, is a python species native to West and Central Africa, where it lives in grasslands, shrublands and open forests. The name "ball python" refers to its tendency to curl into a ball when stressed or frightened.

Taxonomy 
Boa regia was the scientific name proposed by George Shaw in 1802 for a pale variegated python from an indistinct place in Africa.
The generic name Python was proposed by François Marie Daudin in 1803 for non-venomous flecked snakes. Between 1830 and 1849, several generic names were proposed for the same zoological specimen described by Shaw, including Enygrus by Johann Georg Wagler, Cenchris and Hertulia by John Edward Gray. Gray also described four specimens that were collected in Gambia and were preserved in spirits and fluid.

Description

The ball python is black, or albino and dark brown with light brown blotches on the back and sides. Its white or cream belly is scattered with black markings. It is a stocky snake with a relatively small head and smooth scales. Males typically measure eight to ten subcaudal scales, and females typically measure two to four subcaudal scales.
Both sexes have pelvic spurs on both sides of the vent. During copulation, males use these spurs for gripping females. Males tend to have larger spurs, and sex is best determined by manual eversion of the male hemipenes or inserting a probe into the cloaca to check the presence of an inverted hemipenis.

Distribution and habitat
The ball python is native to west Sub Saharan Africa from Senegal, Mali, Guinea-Bissau, Guinea, Sierra Leone, Liberia, Ivory Coast, Ghana, Benin, and Nigeria through Cameroon, Chad, and the Central African Republic to Sudan and Uganda.
It prefers grasslands, savannas, and sparsely wooded areas.

Behavior and ecology
Ball pythons are typically nocturnal or crepuscular, meaning that they are active during dusk, dawn, and/or nighttime. This species is known for its defense strategy that involves coiling into a tight ball when threatened, with its head and neck tucked away in the middle. This defense behavior is typically employed in lieu of biting, which makes this species easy for humans to handle and has contributed to their popularity as a pet. 

In the wild, ball pythons favor mammal burrows and other underground hiding places, where they also aestivate.  Males tend to display more semi-arboreal behaviors, whilst females tend towards terrestrial behaviors.

Diet
The diet of the ball python in the wild consists mostly of small mammals and birds. Young ball pythons of less than  prey foremost on small birds. Ball pythons longer than  prey foremost on small mammals. Males prey more frequently on birds, and females more frequently on mammals. Rodents make up a large percentage of the diet; Gambian pouched rats, black rats, rufous-nosed rats, shaggy rats, and striped grass mice are among the species consumed.

Reproduction

Females are oviparous and lay three to 11 rather large, leathery eggs. The eggs hatch after 55 to 60 days. Young male pythons reach sexual maturity at 11–18 months, and females at 20–36 months. Age is only one factor in determining sexual maturity and the ability to breed; weight is the second factor. Parental care of the eggs ends once they hatch, and the female leaves the offspring to fend for themselves.

Threats 
The Ball python is listed as Near Threatened on the IUCN Red List; it experiences a high level of exploitation and the population is believed to be in decline in most of West Africa. The ball python is primarily threatened by poaching for the international exotic pet trade. It is also hunted for its skin, meat and use in traditional medicine. Other threats include habitat loss as a result of intensified agriculture and pesticide use. Rural hunters in Togo collect gravid females and egg clutches, which they sell to snake ranches. In 2019 alone, 58 interviewed hunters had collected 3,000 live ball pythons and 5,000 eggs.

In captivity

Ball pythons are the most popular pet snake and the second most popular pet reptile after the bearded dragon. According to the IUCN Red List, while captive bred animals are widely available in the pet trade, capture of wild specimens for sale continues to cause significant damage to wild populations. Wild-caught specimens have greater difficulty adapting to a captive environment, which can result in refusal to feed, and they generally carry internal or external parasites. This species can do quite well in captivity, regularly living for 15-30 years with good care. The oldest recorded ball python in captivity is 62 years, 59 of those at the Saint Louis Zoo.

Breeding
Captive ball pythons are often bred for specific patterns that do not occur in the wild, called "morphs." Breeders are continuously creating new designer morphs, and over 7,500 different morphs currently exist. Most morphs are considered solely cosmetic with no harm or benefit to the individual animal. However, the "spider" morph gene has been linked to neurological disease, specifically related to the snake's sense of balance. Due to the ethical concerns associated with intentionally breeding a color pattern linked to genetic disease, the International Herpetological Society banned the sale of spider morphs at their events beginning in 2018.

In culture
The ball python is particularly revered by the Igbo people in southeastern Nigeria, who consider it symbolic of the earth, being an animal that travels so close to the ground. Even Christian Igbos treat ball pythons with great care whenever they come across one in a village or on someone's property; they either let them roam or pick them up gently and return them to a forest or field away from houses. If one is accidentally killed, many communities on Igbo land still build a coffin for the snake's remains and give it a short funeral. In northwestern Ghana, there is a taboo towards pythons as people consider them a savior and cannot hurt or eat them. According to folklore a python once helped them flee from their enemies by transforming into a log to allow them to cross a river.

References

External links

 
 
 

ball python
Snakes of Africa
Fauna of Sub-Saharan Africa
Reptiles of West Africa
Reptiles of Cameroon
Reptiles of the Central African Republic
Reptiles of the Democratic Republic of the Congo
Reptiles of South Sudan
Reptiles of Uganda
ball python
Taxa named by George Shaw
Reptiles as pets